The Kuzu were a people of ancient Japan.

Kuzu may also refer to:

 Kuzu, Tochigi, former town in Japan
 Kuzu Airlines Cargo, a cargo airline based in Istanbul, Turkey
 Kudzu (Pueraria lobata), a climbing vine
 Kuzu (surname), Turkish-language surname
 Kuzu, a 2014 Turkish film
 KUZU-LP, a low-power radio station (92.9 FM) licensed to serve Denton, Texas, United States

See also

 "Kuzu Kuzu"
 Kazoo
 Kudzu, a climbing, coiling vine also known as Chinese arrowroot and Japanese arrowroot